Jorge Manuel Pinto Rodríguez, (La Serena 18 December 1944) is a Chilean historian. He is known in Chile for his study of the history of Araucanía, social history and demography. In 2012 he gained the Chilean National History Award.

References

20th-century Chilean historians
20th-century Chilean male writers
21st-century Chilean historians
21st-century Chilean male writers
1944 births
Living people
University of Chile alumni
Academic staff of the University of Chile
People from La Serena